Woodbourne is a rural settlement in Marlborough, New Zealand. Woodbourne Airport is the major airport for Marlborough, and RNZAF Base Woodbourne shares the airport's runways.

Historic building
Woodbourne Homestead is a large timber house built in the early 1850s by sheep farmer Henry Godfrey.

Demographics
It is part of the Woodbourne statistical area.

Woodbourne settlement had a population of 582 at the 2018 New Zealand census, an increase of 180 people (44.8%) since the 2013 census, and a decrease of 93 people (-13.8%) since the 2006 census. There were 159 households. There were 333 males and 246 females, giving a sex ratio of 1.35 males per female, with 132 people (22.7%) aged under 15 years, 237 (40.7%) aged 15 to 29, 180 (30.9%) aged 30 to 64, and 21 (3.6%) aged 65 or older.

Ethnicities were 85.6% European/Pākehā, 19.1% Māori, 2.6% Pacific peoples, 3.6% Asian, and 3.6% other ethnicities (totals add to more than 100% since people could identify with multiple ethnicities).

Although some people objected to giving their religion, 60.8% had no religion, 28.9% were Christian, 0.5% were Buddhist and 5.2% had other religions.

Of those at least 15 years old, 60 (13.3%) people had a bachelor or higher degree, and 42 (9.3%) people had no formal qualifications. The employment status of those at least 15 was that 333 (74.0%) people were employed full-time, 42 (9.3%) were part-time, and 9 (2.0%) were unemployed.

Woodbourne statistical area

Woodbourne had a population of 2,094 at the 2018 New Zealand census, an increase of 441 people (26.7%) since the 2013 census, and an increase of 180 people (9.4%) since the 2006 census. There were 720 households. There were 1,083 males and 1,011 females, giving a sex ratio of 1.07 males per female. The median age was 39.3 years (compared with 37.4 years nationally), with 420 people (20.1%) aged under 15 years, 426 (20.3%) aged 15 to 29, 894 (42.7%) aged 30 to 64, and 354 (16.9%) aged 65 or older.

Ethnicities were 91.8% European/Pākehā, 11.6% Māori, 1.9% Pacific peoples, 2.3% Asian, and 2.6% other ethnicities (totals add to more than 100% since people could identify with multiple ethnicities).

The proportion of people born overseas was 15.5%, compared with 27.1% nationally.

Although some people objected to giving their religion, 54.6% had no religion, 37.0% were Christian, 0.3% were Hindu, 0.4% were Buddhist and 2.9% had other religions.

Of those at least 15 years old, 420 (25.1%) people had a bachelor or higher degree, and 210 (12.5%) people had no formal qualifications. The median income was $42,900, compared with $31,800 nationally. The employment status of those at least 15 was that 978 (58.4%) people were employed full-time, 294 (17.6%) were part-time, and 24 (1.4%) were unemployed.

Notes

Populated places in the Marlborough Region